Ambrose Lam San-keung (born August 1961) is a Hong Kong solicitor who served as the member of Legislative Council, representing Legal constituency. He previously served as president of the Law Society of Hong Kong from 2013 until his resignation in 2014. He is known for his pro-Beijing political stance. He gained widespread attention from the Hong Kong media in 2014, when he made numerous controversial comments supporting the 2014 Hong Kong electoral reform consultation and the Chinese Communist Party. He resigned as the President of the Law Society of Hong Kong on 19 August 2014 after a motion of no confidence was passed against him by members of the Law Society Council on 14 August 2014.

Lam has served as a member of the Law Society Council since 2004. He also led 12 candidates to participate in the 2011 Hong Kong Election Committee Subsector elections, all of which are council members, though all of them failed to get a seat.

Controversial remarks
As president of the Society of Hong Kong, Lam made some controversial remarks which are said to have angered many members of the Council.

Views towards the Chinese Communist Party
When asked his views on the Chinese Communist Party, the sole governing and ruling political party of the People's Republic of China, Lam expressed his admiration towards the party, describing it as "great", citing the party's ability in "guiding China into a new era" and transforming mainland China into one of the world's superpowers over the last few decades. His views sparked widespread criticism from the legal sector.

Views towards Beijing's controversial White Paper
When asked his views on the controversial White Paper issued by the Central People's Government, which called for Hong Kong judges to be patriotic and included judges as "administrators" of the HKSAR, Lam stated that the requirement for judges to be patriotic did not undermine the rule of law, and that he saw no problem in regarding the judiciary as being part of the government's "administrators". His views sparked widespread criticism from the legal sector, of which many believed that the judiciary should not be counted as part of the administration due to Hong Kong's separation of powers. Hong Kong's former Chief Justice of the Court of Final Appeal, Andrew Li, expressed "great concern" towards Lam's comments, commenting that judges should not be pro or anti anyone under the principle of judicial independence. In response to this allegation, Lam stated that judicial independence will not be compromised if judges are required to be patriotic.

Other controversies

Refusal to answer questions in English
On 5 May 2014, in a press conference on 2014 Hong Kong electoral reform consultation, then-President of the Law Society Ambrose Lam was asked about the Council's views towards the “love your country” requirement for Chief Executive Candidates in the 2017 Hong Kong Chief Executive election by a TVB Pearl News reporter in English. Lam, however, refused to answer the reporter's question in English, saying that "he already provided the answer in Chinese", and that "the reporters can translate it (his answers in Chinese) into English". His refusal to answer questions in English despite his fluency in English has resulted in widespread criticism. As a result of the incident, Lam was nicknamed "clown" by some of his critics, and has led to questions about Hong Kong's status as an Asia’s World City.

Legislative Council 
Lam said that there should be a blanket ban on all overseas lawyers from taking part in national security cases, after Jimmy Lai was blocked from hiring Tim Owen.

References

1961 births
Living people
Hong Kong legal professionals
Solicitors of Hong Kong
HK LegCo Members 2022–2025
Members of the Election Committee of Hong Kong, 2021–2026
Hong Kong pro-Beijing politicians